Mihaela Moldovan (born 23 March 1981) is a Romanian former professional tennis player.

Moldovan has career-high WTA rankings of 358 in singles, achieved on 13 September 1999, and 379 in doubles, set on 13 September 1999. Moldovan retirement from professional tennis in 2005.

Playing for Romania at the Fed Cup, Moldovan has a win–loss record of 3–4.

ITF finals

Singles (1–3)

Doubles (2–3)

Fed Cup participation

Singles (2–2)

Doubles (1–2)

References

External links 
 
 

1981 births
Living people
Romanian female tennis players